David Baramidze (Davit' Baramidze; born September 27, 1988) is a German chess Grandmaster.

Baramidze was born in Tbilisi, Georgia. He obtained the title of Grandmaster in 2004, which made him the youngest German Grandmaster ever. In this year, he also finished 2nd in the World Youth Championships. He is currently ranked 10th in Germany (Elo rating 2601, October 2021). He represented Germany in the 2008 Chess Olympiad in Dresden.

References

External links 
 
 

German chess players
Chess players from Georgia (country)
Chess grandmasters
Chess Olympiad competitors
Georgian emigrants to Germany
Sportspeople from Tbilisi
1988 births
Living people